Brykovy Gory is a rural locality (a village) in Slednevskoye Rural Settlement, Alexandrovsky District, Vladimir Oblast, Russia. The population was 36 as of 2010. There are 5 streets.

Geography 
Brykovy Gory is located 19 km west of Alexandrov (the district's administrative centre) by road. Polinosovo is the nearest rural locality.

References 

Rural localities in Alexandrovsky District, Vladimir Oblast
Alexandrovsky Uyezd (Vladimir Governorate)